Kur Cheshmeh or Kur Chashmeh may refer to:

Kur Cheshmeh, Qazvin